Baseball at Night is a 1934 oil painting by the artist Morris Kantor. The artist had taken in a night game held at the Clarkstown Country Club in West Nyack, New York, which was then a rare novelty.

References

American paintings
1934 paintings
Baseball mass media